Arsuz Karaağaçspor is a Turkish sports club from İskenderun, in southern Turkey.

The clubs plays in orange and blue kits, and have done so since their formation in 2009.  The club is a phoenix club of İskenderunspor which folded in 2006.

In 2019–2020 season, Arsuz Karaağaçspor compete in the Hatay Amateur Leagues.

Previous names
 Yeni İskenderunspor (2009–2011)
 İskenderunspor 1967 (2011–2012)
 Arsuz Karaağaçspor (2012–present)

League participations
 TFF Third League: 2010–2013
 Turkish Regional Amateur League: 2013–2014, 2016–2019
 Hatay Amateur Leagues: 2009–2010, 2014–2016, 2019–present

League performances

Notes:
^ The team withdrew from the competition in 2013–14

Source: TFF: İskenderunspor 1967

References

External links
SOCCERWAY PROFILE
ISKENDERUN GAZETESI (NEWSPAPER)

Football clubs in Hatay
2009 establishments in Turkey
Phoenix clubs (association football)
Association football clubs established in 2009